This is a list of commanders of the Russian Army in 1812 before the Patriotic War of 1812.

 

A

B

C

D

E

F

G

H

I

J

K

L

M

N

O

P

R

S

T

U

V

W

Y

Z

Footnotes

External links
 List of portraits in the Military Gallery
 List of Russian generals in 1812
 Russian Generals and Naval Commanders of the Napoleonic Epoch

Lists of Russian and Soviet military personnel
1812 in the Russian Empire

Lists of generals